Pat Carroll (1927–2022) was an American actress.

Pat Carroll may also refer to:
 Pat Carroll (baseball) (1853–1916), American Major League Baseball catcher
 Pat Carroll (basketball) (born 1982), American professional basketball player
 Pat Carroll (singer) (born 1946), Australian singer from the 1960s
 Pat Carroll (soccer) (born 1985), American soccer player
 Pat Carroll (hurler) (1956–1986), Irish hurler
 Pat Carroll (runner) (born 1961), Australian long-distance runner